Armando Carlos Silva e Costa (born 3 June 1983) is an Angolan professional basketball guard. Costa plays for the Angolan side of Primeiro de Agosto in the Angolan league BIC Basket and in the Africa Champions Cup. With the Angola national basketball team, he represented Angola in the 2006 FIBA World Championship, 2007 African Championship, and 2008 Summer Olympics.

See also
Angola national basketball team

References

External links
 

1983 births
Living people
Basketball players from Luanda
Angolan men's basketball players
Basketball players at the 2008 Summer Olympics
Olympic basketball players of Angola
Point guards
C.D. Primeiro de Agosto men's basketball players
2014 FIBA Basketball World Cup players
2006 FIBA World Championship players